A warung (old spelling: waroeng or warong) is a type of small family-owned business —  a small retail, eatery or café — in Indonesia (and to a lesser extent, Malaysia and Suriname). A warung is an essential part of daily life in Indonesia. In the passage of time, the term warung has slightly shifted — especially among foreign visitors, expatriates, and people abroad — to refer more specifically to a modest Indonesian eatery or a place that sells Indonesian retail things (mostly groceries or foodstuff). But for the majority of Indonesians, the meaning is still a small, neighborhood convenience shop, often a front room in a family's home.

There are establishments on the touristy island of Bali and elsewhere that attach the term warung in their business to indicate their Indonesian nature. Traditionally, warung is indeed a family-owned business, run by the family members, mostly by women.

Traditional warungs are made from wooden, bamboo or thatched materials. More permanent warungs are made from bricks and concrete, some family-owned businesses are attached to their homes. Some smaller portable warungs are made from tin, zinc or some modern version might use fiberglass mold. Warung tenda is a portable tent warung, covered with canvas, fabric, tarp or plastic sheet tent for roofing.

Terminology

The term warung simply denotes a wide category of small businesses, either a small retail shop or eatery. It is widely used in Java and most of Indonesia. In certain parts of Sumatra and Malay Peninsula, the word kedai is sometimes used as well. In Javanese culture areas, such as in Yogyakarta, Semarang and Surakarta, its counterpart term wedhangan or angkringan is more commonly found. On the other hand, the term toko is used for a larger and more established shop.

The term can be used to loosely refer to many other types of shops, including the wartel (short for warung telepon, essentially a manned phone booth) and warnet (short for warung internet Internet café).

Varieties
There are many kinds of warung, some take the form of a small shop that sells cold bottled drinks, candy, cigarettes, snacks, krupuk and other daily necessities, while the larger ones are small restaurant establishments. A warung that sells food typically sells local food; pisang goreng and many kinds of gorengan, nasi goreng (fried rice), and mie goreng (fried noodles).

On the resort island of Bali and Lombok, warung might refer to a touristy cabana cafe that sells locals' favourites as well as Asian or western food. Other than Indonesian dishes, on their menu there might be a selection of soups, steaks, fries, sandwiches or grilled fish.

Some types of warung are:
 Warung rokok or common warung is a very small street side shop, constructed from wood, bamboo or tin. Most of them measure not more than 2 x 1 meters (6.56 x 328 feet). They sell rokok (cigarettes), cold bottled drinks, snacks and candies, krupuk, soap, tooth paste and other daily necessities, essentially a miniaturized convenience store. This is the most commonly distributed warung, sprung in residential areas, slums, street sides, and tucked between high rise business areas.
 Warkop or warung kopi is a small humble cafe or coffeeshop that sells coffee and snacks, such as roasted peanuts, rempeyek, krupuk, pisang goreng and bread. At a time in Indonesia, the Malaysian and Singaporean counterpart kopi tiam, gained popularity instead of humble local warung kopi. Traditionally, warung kopi served a social function as a gathering place for men of the village to socialize and trade news. As time passes, specialty cafes were flourished spurred by the surge of the locals interest in quality coffee. As a result, various cafes were growing, from humble warung kopi to fancy coffeeshop selling artisan and premium specialty coffee. 
 Warung nasi is a humble small restaurant that sells nasi (rice) with other Indonesian dishes. Instead of separate tables and chairs, a long communal bar and bench are usually provided for customers to dine at.
 Warteg or warung tegal is a more specific warung nasi, established by Javanese people from the town Tegal in Central Java. They sell favourite Javanese dishes and rice, the wide array of pre-cooked dishes are arranged in glass windowed cupboard. They are well known on selling modestly-priced meals, popular among working class such as low-skilled labours in the cities.
 Warung padang is a small scaled Padang restaurant. Usually provides bar and bench instead of tables and chairs for seating, and sometimes, a choice of fewer dishes. Larger scale are more established Padang eateries are referred to as rumah makan padang or Padang restaurant instead.
 Warung jamu specifically selling jamu traditional herbal medicine.  
 Warnet or warung internet is an internet cafe.
 Wartel or warung telepon is a manned phone booth.

Most of the time, warung are named after the main dishes they sell. For example, warung bubur kacang ijo or warung burjo sells bubur kacang hijau, warung roti bakar sells grilled bread, warung pecel lele sells pecel lele or fried catfish with sambal, while warung indomie sells cooked instant noodles, although the brand might not always be Indomie.

Gallery

See also
 Toko
 Kopi tiam
 Sari-sari store
 Mamak stall

References

External links

 "What is a Warung?"

Retailing in Malaysia
Retailing in Indonesia
Malaysian culture
Indonesian culture
Street food in Indonesia